The 2012 English cricket season was the 113th in which the County Championship had been an official competition. It began on 31 March with a round of university matches, and continued until the final of the Clydesdale Bank 40 on 15 September. Three major domestic competitions were contested: the 2012 County Championship won by Warwickshire, the 2012 Clydesdale Bank 40 and the 2012 Friends Life t20 both won by Hampshire Royals.

During this season, three Test teams toured England: West Indies lost both the Test series (2–0) and the One Day International (ODI) series (2–0), and the solitary Twenty20 International (T20I). Australia also toured, in a series of five match One Day International (ODI) series which they lost 4–0. South Africa also toured, beating England in a three Test series 2–0 and drew the five match ODI series and the three match Twenty20 International (T20I) series.

Roll of honour
Test series
 England v West Indies: 3 Tests - England won 2–0.
 England v South Africa: 3 Tests - South Africa won 2–0.

ODI series
 England v West Indies: 3 ODIs - England won 2–0.
 England v Australia: 5 ODIs - England won 4–0.
 England v South Africa: 5 ODIs - Series drawn 2-2.

Twenty20 International series
 England v West Indies: Only T20I - England won by 7 wickets.
 England v South Africa: 3 T20Is - Series drawn 1-1.

County Championship
 Division One winners: Warwickshire
 Division One Runners-up: Somerset
 Division Two winners: Derbyshire (on most wins)
 Relegated from Division One: Lancashire and Worcestershire
 Promoted from Division Two: Derbyshire and Yorkshire

Clydesdale Bank 40 (CB40)
 Winners: Hampshire Royals - Runners-up: Warwickshire Bears

Friends Life t20
 Winners: Hampshire Royals - Runners-up: Yorkshire Carnegie

Minor Counties Championship
 Winners: Cornwall

MCCA Knockout Trophy
 Winners: Cumberland

Second XI Championship
 Winners: Kent II

Second XI Trophy
 Winners: Lancashire II - Runners-up: Durham II

Second XI Twenty20 - Winners England Under-19s

Wisden Cricketers of the Year
 Tim Bresnan, Alastair Cook, Glen Chapple, Alan Richardson, Kumar Sangakkara

PCA Player of the Year
 Nick Compton

PCA Most Valuable Player of the Year
 Peter Trego

Test series

Wisden Trophy

Basil D'Oliveira Trophy

County Championship

Divisions

Division One Standings
 Pld = Played, W = Wins, L = Losses, D = Draws, T = Ties, A = Abandonments, Bat = Batting points, Bowl = Bowling points, Ded = Deducted points, Pts = Points.

Division Two Standings
 Pld = Played, W = Wins, L = Losses, D = Draws, T = Ties, A = Abandonments, Bat = Batting points, Bowl = Bowling points, Ded = Deducted points, Pts = Points.

Clydesdale Bank 40

Group stage

Knockout stage

Friends Life t20

Group stage

Knockout stage

See also
Australian cricket team in England and Ireland in 2012

References

 2012

Cricket season